Brothers is a 1913 American drama film directed by  D. W. Griffith.

Cast
 Charles Hill Mailes as The Father
 Robert Harron as The Father's Favorite Son
 Clara T. Bracy as The Mother
 Harry Carey as The Mother's Favorite Son
 Gertrude Bambrick as Non-Committal Woman
 Walter P. Lewis as The Neighbor
 Adolph Lestina as The Doctor
 Mabel Normand

See also
 List of American films of 1913
 Harry Carey filmography
 D. W. Griffith filmography

References

External links

1913 films
Films directed by D. W. Griffith
American silent short films
American black-and-white films
1913 drama films
1913 short films
Silent American drama films
1910s American films